Back to Life is a 1925 American silent war drama film directed by Whitman Bennett and starring Patsy Ruth Miller, David Powell, and Lawford Davidson.

Plot
As described in a film magazine review, Margaret Lothbury receives news that her husband, an American volunteer aviator serving with the Lafayette Escadrille during World War I, died at the front. In reality, John Lothbury has been picked up by a British ambulance unit and placed in a British hospital. Here by the marvelous, newly developed science of facial surgery, Lothbury is given a new face. On return to  America he finds his wife married to Wallace Straker, richest man in town. The union is an unhappy one. Lothbury adopts the name  Walpole and withholds his identity. He assumes guardianship of his son while the Strakers tour Europe, and while abroad Margaret Lothbury becomes acquainted with the real facts of Lothbury’s disappearance from the battlefield. Later circumstances confirm her suspicions that Walpole is in reality her husband. Revelations follow leading to the re-union of the family.

Cast

Preservation
With no prints of Back to Life located in any film archives, it is a lost film.

References

Bibliography
 Munden, Kenneth White. The American Film Institute Catalog of Motion Pictures Produced in the United States, Part 1. University of California Press, 1997.

External links

1925 films
1920s war drama films
Films directed by Whitman Bennett
American silent feature films
1925 lost films
American black-and-white films
Pathé Exchange films
American World War I films
American war drama films
Films set in France
Films based on British novels
1925 drama films
1920s American films
Silent American drama films
Silent war drama films